Evan Finlayson (1876–1931) was a Scottish professional footballer who played as a full-back.

References

1876 births
1931 deaths
People from Ross and Cromarty
Scottish footballers
Association football fullbacks
Rangers F.C. players
Grimsby Town F.C. players
English Football League players